Hong Chaosheng (10 October 1920 – 19 August 2018) was a Chinese physicist best known for studying cryogenics. Hong was the teacher of Zhao Zhongxian, a laureate of Highest Science and Technology Award, the highest scientific award issued by the Chinese Academy of Sciences to scientists working in China. 

He was a delegate to the 3rd National People's Congress. He was a member of the 5th, 6th, 7th and 8th National Committee of the Chinese People's Political Consultative Conference.

Biography
Hong was born in Beijing on October 10, 1920, to Hong Guantao, a railway engineer and member of Tongmenghui, and Gao Junyuan, daughter of publisher Gao Mengdan. He had two elder sisters, Hong Jing and Hong Ying. He primarily studied at the Yuying School and secondary studied at Huiwen High School, both were missionary schools.  After high school, he studied at Tsinghua University, and then taught at National Southwestern Associated University. He arrived in the United States in 1945 at the age of 25 to begin his education at Massachusetts Institute of Technology in Cambridge, Massachusetts. After university, he worked at Purdue University. In 1950 he went to Netherlands to work at Leiden University.

He returned to China in 1952 and that year became professor of Department of Physics at Tsinghua University, Peking University and the University of Science and Technology of China. He joined the Jiusan Society. In 1953, he became a researcher at the Institute of Geophysics, Chinese Academy of Sciences, where he was deputy director in 1978. He was accepted as an academician of the Chinese Academy of Sciences in 1980. In September 2005, he was hired as a part-time professor at the Graduate College of Chinese Academy of Sciences.

On August 19, 2018, he died of illness at Beijing, aged 98.

Personal life
Hong married Li Ying.

Papers
 Hung C. S., Gliessman J. R. 1950. The resistivity and hall effect ofgermanium at low temper peratures. Phys Rev (Lett), 79: 726.
 Hung C. S. 1950. Theory ofresistivity and hall Effect at very low temperatures. Phys Rev (Lett), 79: 727.
 Hung C. S., Johnson V. A. 1950. Resistivity ofsemiconductors containing both acceptors and donors. Phys Rev ( Lett), 79: 535.
 Hung C. S. 1950. Thermionic emission from oxide cathodes:retarding and accelerating fields. J Appl Phys, 21(1): 37.
 Hung C. S., Baum R. M. 1952. Activation energy of heat treatmentintroduced lattice defects in germanium. Phys Rev, 88(1): 134.
 Hung C. S., Hunt B, Winkel P. 1952. Transport phenomena of liquidhelium II in narrow slits. Phys, 18(8/9): 629.
 Hung C. S., Gliessman J. R. 1954. Resistivity andhall effect of germanium at low temperatures. Phys Rev, 96: 1226.
 Li L. F., Hung C. S., Li Y. Y., Zhang Z. 1996. MartensiticTransformation in ZrO2-CeO2System at CryogenicTemperatures. Cryogenics, 36: 7.

Awards
 1989 Hu Gangfu Physical Award of Chinese Physical Society
 2000 International Cryogenic Engineering Council Mendelsohn Prize
 2011 Samuel Corinth Prize

References

1920 births
2018 deaths
Cryogenics
Educators from Beijing
Massachusetts Institute of Technology alumni
Members of the Chinese Academy of Sciences
Members of the Jiusan Society
Academic staff of Peking University
People of the Republic of China
People's Republic of China politicians from Beijing
People's Republic of China science writers
Physicists from Beijing
Tsinghua University alumni
Academic staff of Tsinghua University
Academic staff of the University of Science and Technology of China
Writers from Beijing
Chinese expatriates in the United States
Chinese expatriates in the Netherlands